Aiviq is an American icebreaking anchor handling tug supply vessel (AHTS) owned by Edison Chouest Offshore (ECO). The $200 million vessel was built in 2012 by North American Shipbuilding in Larose, Louisiana and LaShip in Houma, Louisiana. She was initially chartered by Royal Dutch Shell to support oil exploration and drilling in the Chukchi Sea off Alaska where the primary task of the vessel was towing and laying anchors for drilling rigs, and oil spill response.

The vessel has been called the world's most powerful privately owned icebreaker.

Construction

In July 2009, Edison Chouest Offshore won a $150 million contract for the construction of an icebreaking anchor handling tug supply (AHTS) vessel for Royal Dutch Shell. The  vessel, largest ever built by the company, would be used to support Shell's drilling operations in the Beaufort Sea and Chukchi Sea off Alaska. In January 2010, it was announced that the  vessel would be constructed in Louisiana. The hull and the superstructure would be built in the company's own shipyard North American Shipbuilding in Larose in two separate units while the final assembly of the vessel would take place at LaShip, also owned by Edison Chouest, in Houma. In all, the construction would take just over two years and provide work for about 800 people.

Laid down on 3 February 2010, the newbuilding "Hull 247" was presented to Shell executives on 30 September 2011. By then, the price of the vessel had climbed to $200 million due to material and equipment factors, such as the price of steel. The vessel was launched on 1 November 2011. According to Edison Chouest spokesman Gary Chouest, "It [Aiviq] will be the world's largest and most powerful anchor-handling icebreaker."

In 2011, Shell invited Inupiak schoolchildren to submit essays suggesting names for the vessel. Twelve-year-old Elizabeth Itta submitted the winning essay, describing how the Walrus, "Aiviq" in the Inupiak language, use their tusks to break ice. She won a cash prize for her school and an invitation to attend the ship's launching ceremony on 24 March 2012. The vessel went for sea trials in April and was delivered on 20 April 2012.

The construction of the new icebreaker and Shell's Arctic drilling operation off Alaska raised concerns about the ability of the United States Coast Guard to operate in ice-infested waters since at the time the Coast Guard had only one operational icebreaker, .

In April 2015, it was reported that Edison Chouest would build two Polar Class 3 anchor-handling tug supply (AHTS) vessels at the company's LaShip shipyard in Houma, Louisiana. Unlike Aiviq, the new vessels would have been fitted with Rolls-Royce azimuth thrusters instead of conventional shaftlines and rudders. However, in November 2015 it was reported that Edison Chouest might have canceled the vessels following Shell's decision to halt Arctic oil exploration.

Career

Grounding of Kulluk 

On 27 December 2012, while Aiviq was towing the mobile offshore drilling unit Kulluk off the coast of Kodiak Island, Alaska, the towing line between the icebreaker and the drilling rig parted due to a mechanical failure of the towing shackle. Shortly after the tow had been regained, the main engines of Aiviq failed and the vessel lost propulsion power in  seas. In the following morning, power was successfully restored on one of the four main engines and the vessel was able to hold position in the heavy weather. United States Coast Guard cutter USCGC Alex Haley was dispatched to the scene to monitor the situation. In response to the incident, the Coast Guard, Shell and Edison Chouest established a Unified Command to coordinate the operation. Shell-contracted vessels Guardsman and Nanuq were also en route to the scene.

On 29 December, the Unified Command authorized the drilling rig to drop its anchor to slow its drift towards the coast and ordered the Coast Guard to evacuate the 18 crew members on Kulluk by helicopter as a precaution. Sikorsky HH-60 Jayhawk helicopters operated by the Coast Guard also delivered essential equipment parts to Aiviq and later power was restored on all four engines. Together with Nanuq, Aiviq was able to hold the drilling rig stationary during the crew evacuation and later continue towing the vessel away from the coast.

On 30 December, the tow lines of Aiviq and Nanuq parted again, and Kulluk began drifting towards the coast. Another tugboat, the 10,000-horsepower Alert operated by Crowley Marine Services, also arrived to the scene from Prince William Sound. USCGC Alex Haley also returned to the scene from Kodiak, where the cutter had repaired her fouled port propeller, and relieved the crew of USCGC Spar as on scene commander. The helicopter crews were also preparing to deploy several technicians aboard the drilling rig to evaluate the condition of the towing lines.

Later in the evening, Kulluk was again set adrift after the Coast Guard ordered Alert to separate from the rig, now only  from the nearest point of land, to maintain the safety of the nine crew members on board the tug in nearly  seas.

The salvage operation was awarded to the Dutch salvage company Smit International. A team of five salvage experts boarded Kulluk on 2 January 2013 to assess the structural integrity of the grounded drilling barge. On 3 January, it was reported that Kulluk had suffered damage since the grounding but its structural integrity had not been compromised and there have been no leaks from the rig's fuel tanks. At the time of the grounding, Kulluk was carrying 139,000 gallons of diesel fuel and 12,000 gallons of lubricating and hydraulic oil. By 4 January, 14 vessels had been mobilized for the recovery operation and the United States Department of Defense provided two Boeing CH-47 Chinook helicopters to transport heavy salvage gear to the site.

After the rig was brought to a shipyard in Singapore on board a heavy-lift vessel, Shell decided not to repair the damages and sold the drilling unit for recycling in China.

In the investigation report published by the United States Coast Guard on 2 April 2014, the initiating event to the casualty was identified as the failure of a 120-ton apex shackle which was considered undersized for towing Kulluk in such environmental conditions. The 90-feet catenary surge chain used to damp shock loads in the towing line was also deemed insufficient. According to the Coast Guard, the "numerous and compounding preconditions" that led to the casualty also included various operational issues such as the towing plans that were not adequate for the winter towing operation crossing the Gulf of Alaska and the crew's lack of towing experience in the Gulf of Alaska waters particularly during the wintertime.

In the same report, it was also concluded that the likely cause for Aiviqs loss of main engine power was sea water in the fuel oil. After the casualty, sea water contamination was found in settling tanks, day tanks, main engine primary filters and main engine injectors. The design of the vessel allowed considerable amount of sea water to enter the stern deck and subsequently to the fuel oil tanks through overflow vents in heavy weather. There were also problems with fuel management practices onboard Aiviq.

Kulluk'''s movement south for the winter was at least in part motivated by an effort to avoid State of Alaska property taxes on oil and gas extraction equipment.

Proposed sale to US Coast Guard
On 14 May 2015, US Congressman Duncan Hunter of California, began advocating for the acquisition of Aiviq by the US Coast Guard (USCG) due to an availability gap caused by USCG's deactivation of the icebreaker USCGC Polar Sea. USCG repeatedly turned down Hunter's continued proposals, citing the vessel's unsuitability for military operations and being less-capable than USCGC Healy, with Coast Guard Admiral Charles Michel stating Aiviq is "Not suitable for military service without substantial refit. [...] We have very specific requirements for our vessels, including international law requirements for assertion of things like navigation rights. This vessel does not just break ice."

Controversy arose after it was published that Congressman Hunter had received campaign funding from Aiviq's owner, Edison Chouest Offshore, and contributors connected to the owner, six days before initially advocating the vessel's sale to USCG. Edison Chouest's contributions to Hunter have made them the congressman's second largest donor. The company's donations came as Congressman Hunter was under investigation for misuse of campaign funds. On 12 July 2016, Hunter's advocacy for the vessel's acquisition was joined by US Congressman Don Young of Alaska. Aiviq's owner was Congressman Young's largest campaign donor at that time.

Congressman Hunter's office estimated it would cost US$33 million a year to lease, or US$150 million to buy Aiviq outright.

 Proposed sale to Canada 

However, recent reports indicate that the Canadian Coast Guard is not interested in the vessel. In June 2018, it was announced that the Canadian government ended up partnering with Davie Shipbuilding, but using three ships from Viking Supply Ships.

 Later career 

After years of lay-up, Aiviq was chartered by Australian Antarctic Division to support Davis Station refueling and other Antarctic missions during the 2021–2022 season.

Fully laden, she draws  of water. Since Aiviq is an anchor handling tug and supply vessel, she is fitted with a large towing winch located amidships as well as chain lockers and storage tanks for both liquid and dry bulk cargo under the main deck. Her gross tonnage is 12,892, net tonnage 3,867 and deadweight tonnage 4,129 tonnes.Aiviq is powered by four 12-cylinder Caterpillar C280-12 four stroke medium speed diesel engines, each producing  at 1,000 rpm. The engines are coupled to two  Schottel controllable-pitch propeller in nozzles via Flender reduction gearboxes.Aiviq: Pride of Shell's Alaskan drilling fleet. Professional Mariner, 16 October 2012. She also has two 2,000 kW shaft generators and four 1,700 kW Caterpillar 3512C auxiliary diesel generators that provide power for onboard consumers, including the firefighting system. She has three bow thrusters, one of them of azimuthing fold-down type, and two stern thrusters that give her dynamic positioning capability. For redundancy and improved handling, she has two high-lift rudders.Breaking the Ice . WorkBoat.com, 15 May 2012. The propellers of Aiviq are reportedly designed to be quieter than normal in order to be less disruptive to local marine life.Aiviq'' is classified by the American Bureau of Shipping. Her ice class, ABS A3, indicates that she is strengthened for navigation in polar ice conditions with the presence of multiyear ice floes. Furthermore, the notation "Ice Breaker" states that she is designed and constructed for breaking ice to open navigable channels for other ships.

References

2011 ships
Icebreakers of the United States
Ships built in Louisiana